El Barde is a town in the southwestern Bakool region of Somalia. The larger El Barde District has a total population of 29,179 residents.

Notes

References
Qurac joome

Populated places in Bakool